Maa Metakani temple is located in a forest near to Ulunda, of Subarnapur district, Odisha, India. People of this region say that this goddess is originated from a lady called "META".

See also
 Subarnameru Temple
 Lankeswari Temple
 Patali Srikhetra

External links
Maa Metakani
Goddess Metakani

 
Hindu temples in Subarnapur district